The 54th New Brunswick Legislative Assembly was created following a general election in 1999 and was dissolved on May 10, 2003.

Leadership

The speaker from its first meeting on July 6, 1999, until the Assembly was dissolved was Bev Harrison.  Harrison would go on to be re-elected speaker for the 55th Assembly as well.

Premier Bernard Lord led the government for the whole of the life of the assembly.

The opposition was led from the forming of the assembly until 2001 by former Premier Camille Thériault, then, until May 14, 2002, by interim leader Bernard Richard and from then until dissolution by Shawn Graham.

Elizabeth Weir led the third party New Democrats for the life of the assembly.

Members

All were elected in the 34th general election held on June 7, 1999, except for Jean F. Dubé and Gaston Moore elected in by-elections held on February 5, 2001, and Claude Williams elected in a by-election on April 23, 2001.  In 2002, Pat Crossman died, her Riverview seat remained vacant until the 55th general election.

Members at dissolution

Bold denotes a member of the cabinet.
Italics denotes a party leader
† denotes the Speaker

Former members

Edmond Blanchard, a Liberal, was first elected to the legislature in the 1987 election, he resigned in 2000 to accept an appointment to the Federal Court of Canada.
Pat Crossman, a Progressive Conservative, was first elected in 1999, she died in 2002.
Bernard Thériault, a Liberal, was first elected to the legislature in the 1987 election, he resigned in 2000 to run in the 2000 federal election.
Camille Thériault, a Liberal, was first elected to the legislature in the 1987 election, he resigned as leader of the Liberals and the Opposition as well as his seat in 2001.

See also
1999 New Brunswick general election
Legislative Assembly of New Brunswick

References
 Elections in New Brunswick 1984–2006, Elections New Brunswick (pdf)

Terms of the New Brunswick Legislature
1999 establishments in New Brunswick
2003 disestablishments in New Brunswick